Marcus Graham (born 11 October 1963) is an Australian film, television (including both serials and mini-series) and stage actor and director, with roles including Mulholland Drive and Josh Jarman. He was known as a teenage heartthrob in the early 1990s while starring in the Australian TV soap E Street as the character Stanley "Wheels" Kovac. He is also known for his role as Harvey Ryan in Home and Away

Biography
Marcus Graham was born in Perth, Western Australia as the  son of English-Australian actor Ron Graham, whom was a character actor of numerous theatre and television roles. He graduated from the Western Australian Academy of Performing Arts in 1983, before making his professional debut in 1986.

2006 saw Graham win an Australian Film Institute award for a guest role on the Channel 7 drama Blue Heelers. Other television credits include Good Guys, Bad Guys, All Saints, Shadows of the Heart, The Secret Life of Us, and most recently in the ABC comedy Stupid, Stupid Man. Stage credits include The Rocky Horror Show, The Blue Room opposite Sigrid Thornton and Les Liaisons Dangereuses for the Melbourne Theatre Company and the Bell Shakespeare Company's production of Pericles (2009). Graham also starred in the Australian drama series Underbelly and the American drama series Charmed (episode 2x22).
 
Graham has played two Melbourne underworld figures in Australian television dramas - Alan Williams in 1995's Blue Murder, and Lewis Caine in 2008's Underbelly.

He formerly played Harvey Ryan in the Channel 7 series Home and Away and Pav in Season 1 of the Australian drama The Heights.

Filmography

Awards

Mo Awards
The Australian Entertainment Mo Awards (commonly known informally as the Mo Awards), were annual Australian entertainment industry awards. They recognise achievements in live entertainment in Australia from 1975 to 2016. Marcus Graham won one award in that time.
 (wins only)
|-
| 2003
| Marcus Graham
| Male Actor of the Year
| 
|-

References

External links

Marcus Graham's MySpace

1963 births
Living people
AACTA Award winners
Australian male film actors
Australian male television actors
Male actors from Perth, Western Australia
People educated at Mount Lawley Senior High School
20th-century Australian male actors
21st-century Australian male actors
Western Australian Academy of Performing Arts alumni